Eckins Nunatak is a small, isolated nunatak lying  northeast of Matador Mountain, in the eastern part of Shackleton Glacier in Antarctica. It was named by the Advisory Committee on Antarctic Names for Henry J. Eckins, a United States Antarctic Research Program meteorologist at South Pole Station, winter 1961.

References 

Nunataks of the Ross Dependency
Dufek Coast